Alec Berg (born ) is an American television writer, director and producer.

Biography
Berg is of Swedish descent, and is a graduate of Harvard University. He wrote for the sitcom Seinfeld and is co-creator and executive producer of Barry with Bill Hader. He also co-wrote the screenplays for the films The Cat in the Hat, EuroTrip and The Dictator. Berg is also an executive producer (and sometime director) of Larry David's Curb Your Enthusiasm as well as an executive producer of Silicon Valley. In 2016, Alec Berg signed an overall deal with HBO.

Filmography

Writing

Directing

Producing

Acting

References

External links

 

American comedy writers
German-language film directors
Place of birth missing (living people)
The Harvard Lampoon alumni
Living people
Year of birth missing (living people)
American people of Swedish descent